The 2019 FIVB Volleyball Men's U21 World Championship was the twentieth edition of the FIVB Volleyball Men's U21 World Championship, contested by the men's national teams under the age of 21 of the members of the FIVB, the sport's global governing body. The tournament was held in Riffa, Bahrain from 18 to 27 July 2019. 16 teams from the 5 confederations competed in the tournament.

Players must be born on or after 1 January 1999.

Iran won its first title in the competition, defeating Italy in the final. Brazil defeated Russia for the bronze medal. Amirhossein Esfandiar from Iran was elected the MVP.

Qualification
A total of 16 teams qualified for the final tournament. In addition to Bahrain, who qualified automatically as hosts, another 10 teams qualified via six separate continental tournaments while the remaining 5 teams qualified via the FIVB U21 World Ranking.

Pools composition

First round
Teams were seeded in the first two positions of each pool following the serpentine system according to their FIVB U21 World Ranking as of January 2019. FIVB reserved the right to seed the hosts as head of pool A regardless of the U21 World Ranking. All teams not seeded were drawn to take other available positions in the remaining lines, following the U21 World Ranking. The draw was held in Manama, Bahrain on 3 June 2019. Rankings are shown in brackets except the hosts who ranked 42nd.

Draw

Second round

Squads

Venues
 Isa Sports City Hall C, Riffa, Bahrain – Pool A, C, E, F, 5th–8th places and Final four
 Isa Sports City Hall B, Riffa, Bahrain – Pool B, D, G, H, 13th–16th places and 9th–12th places

Referees
There were sixteen referees from 5 continental confederations in this tournament.

AVC (5)
 Toan Phong Nguyen

 Tatsuhiro Sawa
 Bae Sun-ok
 Jirasak Pumduang

CAVB (2)
 Redha Bouzidi
 Edgar Serole

CEV (2)
 Aleksandar Vinaliev
 Nicholas Heckford
 Igor Porvaznik

CSV (2)
 José Luis Barrios
 Paulo Luis Beal

NORCECA (3) 
 Lanza Miller
 Daniel Gonzalez
 Miguel A. Figueroa Medina

Pool standing procedure
 Number of matches won
 Match points
 Sets ratio
 Points ratio
 If the tie continues as per the point ratio between two teams, the priority will be given to the team which won the last match between them. When the tie in points ratio is between three or more teams, a new classification of these teams in the terms of points 1, 2 and 3 will be made taking into consideration only the matches in which they were opposed to each other.

Match won 3–0 or 3–1: 3 match points for the winner, 0 match points for the loser
Match won 3–2: 2 match points for the winner, 1 match point for the loser

First round
All times are Arabia Standard Time (UTC+03:00).

Pool A

|}

|}

Pool B

|}

|}

Pool C

|}

|}

Pool D

|}

|}

Second round
All times are Arabia Standard Time (UTC+03:00).

Pool E

|}

|}

Pool F

|}

|}

Pool G

|}

|}

Pool H

|}

|}

Final round
All times are Arabia Standard Time (UTC+03:00).

13th–16th places

13th–16th semifinals

|}

15th place match

|}

13th place match

|}

9th–12th places

9th–12th semifinals

|}

11th place match

|}

9th place match

|}

5th–8th places

5th–8th semifinals

|}

7th place match

|}

5th place match

|}

Final four

Semifinals

|}

3rd place match

|}

Final

|}

Final standing

Awards

Most Valuable Player
 Amirhossein Esfandiar
Best Setter
 Lorenzo Sperotto
Best Outside Spikers
 Daniele Lavia
 Morteza Sharifi

Best Middle Blockers
 Lorenzo Cortesia
 Guilherme Voss Santos
Best Opposite Spiker
 Maksim Sapozhkov
Best Libero
 Mohammad Reza Hazratpour

See also
2019 FIVB Volleyball Women's U20 World Championship

References

External links
Official website
Final Standing
Statistics

FIVB Volleyball Men's U21 World Championship
FIVB U21 World Championship
International volleyball competitions hosted by Bahrain
2019 in Bahraini sport
FIVB Volleyball Men's U21 World Championship